Ralph Bock (born October 8, 1967 in Wolfen) is a German molecular biologist who researches in plant physiology.

Education and career 
After graduating from the University of Halle in 1993, Bock moved to the University of Freiburg, where he received his doctorate in 1996. Part of his study was carried out at Rutgers University in the lab of Pal Maliga's. After habilitation, Bock headed a research group in Freiburg and became a professor in 1999. In 2001, Bock accepted a faculty position at the University of Münster as director and professor at the Institute for Plant Biochemistry and Biotechnology.

In 2004, Bock moved to Potsdam as Director at the Max Planck Institute for Molecular Plant Physiology; there he heads the Department of Organelle Biology, Biotechnology and Molecular Ecophysiology. Since 2005 he has also been an honorary professor at the University of Potsdam and since 2016 at the Hubei University, Wuhan in China.

Honors and awards 
In 2010, Bock became a member of the German Academy of Sciences Leopoldina. In 2021, he became a fellow of the Berlin-Brandenburg Academy of Sciences.

References 

1967 births
People from Anhalt-Bitterfeld
Max Planck Society people
Academic staff of the University of Potsdam
Academic staff of the University of Münster
Molecular biologists
University of Halle alumni
University of Freiburg alumni
Academic staff of the University of Freiburg
Max Planck Institute directors
Members of the German Academy of Sciences Leopoldina
Academic staff of Hubei University
German molecular biologists
Living people